Xunzhai may refer to the following locations in China:

 Xunzhai, Xinhe County, Hebei (寻寨镇), town
 Xunzhai, Yongjia County (巽宅镇), town in Yongjia County, Zhejiang